Egnatia Street may refer to the following roads:

 Egnatia Odos (modern road), a motorway in Greece
 Egnatia Street, Thessaloniki, a commercial street 
 Via Egnatia, a Roman road